Huari may refer to:

Huari culture, a historical civilization in Peru
Huari (archaeological site), an archaeological site in Peru
Huari, Peru, a town in Peru
Huari District, a district in the Huari Province, Peru
Huari Province, a province in the Ancash Region, Peru
Huari, another name for the Aikanã people of Brazil
Huari language, a language of Brazil

See also 
 Wari (disambiguation)